Hirne is a settlement in eastern Ukraine. It is located in the Horlivka Raion of Donetsk Oblast. While de facto in Ukraine, since 2014, the village has been controlled by the unrecognized Donetsk People's Republic.

References

Villages in Horlivka Raion